The County of Gunbower is one of the 37 counties of Victoria which are part of the cadastral divisions of Australia, used for land titles. It is located to the south of the Murray River, from Swan Hill to Echuca.

The County of Gunbower was proclaimed in 1871, with others from the Loddon Land District. The name is an aboriginal word.

Parishes 
Parishes include:
 Cohuna, Victoria
 Gannawarra, Victoria
 Gunbower, Victoria
 Gunbower West, Victoria
 Kerang, Victoria
 Loddon, Victoria
 Macorna, Victoria
 Millewa, Victoria
 Mincha, Victoria
 Mincha West, Victoria
 Mologa, Victoria
 Murrabit, Victoria
 Murrabit West, Victoria
 Patho, Victoria
 Terrick Terrick East, Victoria
 Terrick Terrick West, Victoria
 Tragowel, Victoria
 Torrumbarry, Victoria
 Torrumbarry North, Victoria
 Wharparilla, Victoria
 Yarrowalla, Victoria

References
Vicnames, place name details
Research aids, Victoria 1910
	County of Gunbower, Cadastral map showing parish boundaries and land ownership, 1890. National Library of Australia

Counties of Victoria (Australia)